The Kreuz Chemnitz is a partial cloverleaf interchange with a direct link east–south and vice versa in the German state of Saxony.

The roads crossing in the interchange are the A 4 and the A 72 .

Geography 
The interchange lies within the city limits of Chemnitz.

History 
The interchange was originally in 1939 built as a trumpet interchange. In 1952 and 1953 it was used as a racetrack. In 1962, in order to lengthen the A 72 towards Leipzig, they built a new interchange west of the existing one. In 2001 it was opened to traffic. On November 14. 2006, the A 72 lanes towards Leipzig were opened to traffic, and  became .

Road layout 
Near the interchange the A 4 has a 2x3 layout, and the A 72 has a 2x2 layout. The connections for Hof–Dresden and Dresden–Hof have a 2x2 configuration. All other connections have a single lane.

Traffic near the interchange

References 

Chemnitz